Shams al-din Muhammad Juvayni was a Persian statesman and member of the Juvayni family. He served as the state treasurer (mustawfi) of the Khwarazmshah Ala al-Din Muhammad II and his son Jalal ad-Din Mingburnu.

Shams al-Din Muhammad had a son named Baha al-Din Muhammad Juvayni, whose sons Ata-Malik Juvayni and Shams al-Din Juvayni would become influential figures in the early days of Ilkhanate rule in Iran.

Sources 
 

13th-century deaths
Year of birth unknown
13th-century Iranian people
Juvayni family
People from Khorasan
Officials of the Khwarazmian Empire